Umaru is a given name. Notable people with the name include:

Umaru bin Ali  (c. 1824 – 1891), Sultan of Sokoto
Umaru Tanko Al-Makura (born 1952), Nigerian businessman elected Governor of Nasarawa State, Nigeria
Umaru Argungu (born 1959), Senator for Kebbi North constituency of Kebbi State, Nigeria
Umaru Bago Tafida, 12th Emir, or traditional ruler of Lapai in Niger State, Nigeria
Umaru Bangura (born 1987), Sierra Leonean international footballer
Umaru Dahiru (born 1952), elected Senator for the Sokoto South constituency of Sokoto State, Nigeria
Umaru Dikko (born 1936), Nigerian politician and was a trusted adviser to President Shehu Shagari
Umaru Mohammed, appointed Governor of North-Western State in Nigeria in July 1975
Umaru Musa Yar'Adua (1951–2010), the President of Nigeria and the 13th Head of State
Umaru Mutallab (born 1939), Nigerian business and banking leader, former minister of Economic Development
Sylvester Umaru Onu (born 1938), Nigerian judge
Umaru Pulavar, Tamil Muslim poet from Tamil Nadu, India
Umaru Rahman (born 1982), Sierra Leonean international footballer who is a striker
Umaru of Salga (1858–1934), left a detailed account of Quranic education among the Hausa
Umaru Sanda Ndayako (1937–2003), 12th Etsu Nupe. Nigerian Traditional ruler
Dalhatu Umaru Sangari, elected Senator for the Taraba South constituency of Taraba State, Nigeria
Sitta Umaru Turay (born 1978), Sierra Leonean journalist on the Freetown-based Sierra Express newspaper
Mohammed Ndatsu Umaru, Military Governor of Kwara State, Nigeria from August 1985 to December 1987
Himouto! Umaru-chan, a Japanese manga series by Sankaku Head

See also
Umaru Musa Yar'adua University